Kavita Shah is a vocalist and composer from New York, NY. She has been hailed by NPR for possessing an
“amazing dexterity with musical languages”.

Early years 

Shah's family is of Gujarati origin, and her parents are originally from Mumbai, India.

Raised in Manhattan, Shah began her musical training in classical piano at age 5. She spent her formative years performing regularly at Carnegie Hall and Lincoln Center as a member of the prestigious Young People's Chorus of New York City, with whom she trained in styles ranging from opera to gospel to folk music in more than 20 languages. She traces her commitment to jazz to the childhood influence of uptown saxophonist Patience Higgins, a former neighbor whose band she would later join at Harlem venues including like Minton's and the Lenox Lounge.

Shah attended New York City public schools, and became fluent in Spanish at the age of 16 after living with a host family in Ecuador. She went on to major in Latin American Studies at Harvard College, where she also studied Yorùbá and became fluent in Portuguese and French. During her undergraduate years, Shah lived abroad in Perú, China, and Brazil, where she conducted fieldwork on Afro-Brazilian music and politics; her honors thesis "Experiments with Transnationalism: Constructing Diaspora in the bloco-afro Malê Debalê” was awarded the Kenneth D. Maxwell Thesis Prize in Brazilian Studies and the Cultural Agents Thesis Prize. While at Harvard, she also received the Cecília Meireles Prize and the David McCord 
Prize.

After college, Shah briefly worked at The Nation magazine and Human Rights Watch,   before a chance meeting with NEA Jazz Master Sheila Jordan on the New York City Subway would steer her toward a career in music. She earned a Master's in Jazz Voice from Manhattan School of Music, where she studied with Theo Bleckmann, Peter Eldridge, Steve Wilson, and Jim McNeely.

Music 

Shah has performed at venues and events including the Kennedy Center, Art Basel: Miami,  Rochester Jazz Festival, San Jose Jazz Festival, Melbourne Jazz Festival,  Park Avenue Armory, Blue Note,  Joe's Pub, Blue Whale, Vermont Jazz Center, Philadelphia Museum of Art, the Rubin Museum of Art, and Copenhagen Jazz Festival.

She has worked with Lionel Loueke, Sheila Jordan, Martial Solal, François Moutin, Greg Osby, Steve Wilson, Alune Wade (Senegal), and Mulatu Astatke.

She was named “Best Graduate Jazz Vocalist” by Downbeat in 2012 and won the ASCAP Herb Alpert Young Jazz Composers Award in 2013.

Shah's 2014 debut album, Visions, was produced by Benin-born jazz guitarist Lionel Loueke, and released on saxophonist Greg Osby's record label Inner Circle Music. "Visions" integrates a jazz quintet with the West African kora and Indian tabla, and includes special guests Loueke (guitar, vocals), Steve Wilson (saxophone, flute), and Rogerio Boccato (percussion).

In 2017, Shah premiered the contemporary work "Folk Songs of Naboréa: a song-cycle for seven voices” at the Park Avenue Armory. The concert was named by NPR critic Nate Chinen as one of the Top 10 Performances of the year.

In 2018, Shah released Interplay, a bass-and-voice duo album co-led by François Moutin, on Dot Time Records. The album features standards and originals, and includes improvisation; Moutin and Shah are joined on two tracks by pianist Martial Solal and vocalist Sheila Jordan. The DownBeat review of the release commented on "Moutin's dark, reedy bass acting like a dance partner to Shah's pliant, flickering vocals, which retain a tonal richness even through passages of extreme agility." Jazz Times also described the album as "a stellar rapport" between the duo who "are fearless in their interpretations".

Discography

As leader 

 Kavita Shah, Visions (Inner Circle Music, 2014), co-produced by Lionel Loueke.

As co-leader  
 François Moutin & Kavita Shah, Interplay (Dot Time Records, 2018), with special guests Sheila Jordan & Martial Solal.

As sideperson 

 Miho Hazama m-unit, Dancer in Nowhere (Universal Japan, 2018).
 Jay Sand, All Around this World: South and Central Asia Vol. 1, produced by Samir Chatterjee (2015).
 Fredy Guzmán, Waijazz, produced by Lionel Loueke (2015).
 Steve Newcomb Orchestra, Caterpillar Chronicles (Listen Hear, 2012).

References

External links 

 

American jazz singers
Year of birth missing (living people)
Living people
Harvard University alumni